Moonchild: Songs Without Words is a 2006 album by John Zorn featuring performances by Joey Baron, Mike Patton, and Trevor Dunn (sometimes referred to as the "Moonchild Trio"). It was inspired in part by Aleister Crowley, who wrote the novel Moonchild, Antonin Artaud, and Edgard Varèse. Moonchild: Songs Without Words has been performed internationally by the trio, conducted by John Zorn.

Track listing

Personnel 
 John Zorn – producer, conductor
 Trevor Dunn – bass
 Joey Baron – drums
 Mike Patton – voice

References 

Moonchild albums
Albums produced by John Zorn
Tzadik Records albums
2006 albums